Mahabo is a city (commune urbaine) in the Menabe Region, Western Madagascar. It has a population of 35,532 in 2018.

Geography 
This town lies on the Route nationale 35 from Morondava to Ivato

Cities in Madagascar
Populated places in Menabe